Leave It to Gerry is a 1924 American silent comedy film directed by Arvid E. Gillstrom and starring Billie Rhodes, William Collier Jr., and Claire McDowell.

Plot
As described in a film magazine review, Geraldine Brent, known as Gerry, goes to Chicago to be educated at her rich aunt's expense. The land on which her mother's house stands is mortgaged but has oil on it, and Colonel Pettijohn conspires to obtain possession of it. The mortgage is foreclosed and Mrs. Brent is taken to the workhouse. Gerry meets former boy acquaintance Dan Forbes and becomes his sweetheart. They ride to the workhouse and rescue Mrs. Brent. Colonel Pettijohn's schemes are defeated and Mrs. Brent regains her property.

Cast

Preservation
With no prints of Leave It to Gerry located in any film archives, it is a lost film.

References

Bibliography
 Robert B. Connelly. The Silents: Silent Feature Films, 1910-36, Volume 40, Issue 2. December Press, 1998.

External links

1924 films
1924 comedy films
1920s English-language films
American silent feature films
Silent American comedy films
American black-and-white films
Films directed by Arvid E. Gillstrom
1920s American films